...And Six Dark Hours Pass is an LP by the American industrial band ATelecine, released in 2010 by Dais Records.

It was recorded and mixed at the Gayblade and NTBH Sounds, and limited to 500 hand-numbered copies.

Track listing
Side A
 "...Night November"
 "Puget"
 "Sky Then Trees Then Birds Then Nothing"
Side B
 "Very Small Friends"
 "Armour (Cut)"
 "Sixth Pass"

Personnel
 Pablo St. Francis: Vocals, bass, drums, synthesizer
 Sasha Grey: Vocals, lyrics, synthesizer, tape loops
 Frédéric Poincelet: Artwork, design

References

2010 albums
ATelecine albums